Cochylimorpha scrophulana is a species of moth of the family Tortricidae. It is found in Fars Province, Iran.

The wingspan is 20–21 mm. The ground colour of the forewings is whitish with ochreous spots on the costa and some larger ochreous spots beyond the middle of the wing. The hindwings are white.

References

Moths described in 1963
Cochylimorpha
Taxa named by Józef Razowski
Moths of Asia